Johnston Road is a major road in Wan Chai on the Hong Kong Island of Hong Kong.

Location

History
The road was named after Alexander Robert Johnston, the British Deputy Superintendent of Trade during the First Opium War. He was the government administrator even before Sir Henry Pottinger was appointed the first Hong Kong governor in 1842. The story that the street was named after Sir Reginald Johnston was actually a myth.

The road is built on the margin of the oldest building cluster in Wan Chai. Many Hong Kong residents are trying to preserve the old buildings and trees from redevelopment. The century-old transport Hong Kong Tramways goes through the road with its first service opening in 1904.

Although the road was named in 1920s, part of the road can be traced back to 1851 or earlier when the area was known as Praya East. The section from Spring Garden Lane to Wan Chai Road was known as Strand Road, for its proximity to the waterfront.

Intersections

In popular culture

This road and its junction with Wan Chai Road was a Pit Stop in the eleventh leg of the reality TV show The Amazing Race 30.

Transport
The faster transport MTR is located near the road with some exits of Wan Chai station nearby.

See also
 List of streets and roads in Hong Kong
 Queen's Road East, for a list of lanes connecting Johnston Road and Queen's Road East
 May Wah Building, located at Nos. 164-176 Johnston Road

References

External links

Google Maps of Johnston Road

Wan Chai
Roads on Hong Kong Island